Abdul Rasheed Hussain (born September 16, 1946) is a historian, linguist and poet, and a former Minister of Cabinet of the Maldives during the Maumoon Abdul Gayoom administration. 
His first cabinet portfolio was as the Minister of Atolls Administration in 1993. In addition, he has filled other cabinet positions such as Minister of Employment and Labour, Minister of Planning, Human Resources and Environment, Minister of Fisheries, Agriculture and Marine Resources, and Minister for Higher Education, Employment and Social Security. He also served in the People's Majlis for over 20 years and served as the Deputy Speaker from 2000 to 2005.
He holds a BA (Honours) in Economics from the University of Karachi in Pakistan and is the first Maldivian to hold a graduate degree in Economics.

On 27 July 2013, Mr Abdul Rasheed Hussain was awarded the Most Honourable Order of Distinguished Rule of Izzudheen (Nishaan Izzuddeen Izzathuge Verikan), the second highest honour conferred by the Maldivian State.
Abdul Rasheed Hussain is currently retired and serves as chairman of Liyuntheringe Gulhun, a literary organization of distinguished writers in the Maldives. He lives in the capital with his wife Moonisa Ibrahim.

External links 
https://web.archive.org/web/20071215095854/http://www.ifad.org/events/gc/26/speech/maldives.htm
http://www.fao.org/worldfoodsummit/top/detail.asp?event_id=12864
http://www.presidencymaldives.gov.mv/pages/eng_news.php?news:4098:1
https://web.archive.org/web/20061004102610/http://www.bobpigo.org/bbn/sep_04/Pages-4-5.pdf
http://www.presidencymaldives.gov.mv/?lid=11&dcid=13069
http://www.sun.mv/english/14610
https://web.archive.org/web/20150402101803/http://www.haveeru.com.mv/independence_day/50245
http://www.presidencymaldives.gov.mv/?lid=11&dcid=6635

1946 births
Maldivian poets
University of Karachi alumni
Living people
Government ministers of the Maldives
20th-century Maldivian writers
21st-century Maldivian writers
Linguists from the Maldives
Maldivian historians
20th-century poets
20th-century historians
20th-century linguists
20th-century male writers
21st-century poets
21st-century historians
21st-century linguists
21st-century male writers